Pentaschistis is a genus of grass in the family Poaceae. 
It includes the following species:
 Pentaschistis chrysurus
 Pentaschistis dolichochaeta
 Pentaschistis mannii
 Pentaschistis pictigluma

References

Danthonioideae
Poaceae genera
Taxonomy articles created by Polbot